Czarże  is a village in the administrative district of Gmina Dąbrowa Chełmińska, within Bydgoszcz County, Kuyavian-Pomeranian Voivodeship, in north-central Poland. It is located in the Chełmno Land in the historic region of Pomerania.

History
The oldest known mention of the village comes from a document of Duke Konrad I of Masovia from 1222.

During the German occupation (World War II), in 1939, local Polish teachers were murdered by the Germans in a massacre of Poles committed in nearby Klamry as part of the Intelligenzaktion. In October 1940, the occupiers also carried out expulsions of Poles, whose farms were then handed over to German colonists as part of the Lebensraum policy.

Notable people
 Piotr Konieczka (1901–1939), corporal of the Polish Army, considered the first victim of World War II; born in Czarże

References

Villages in Bydgoszcz County